Charles Napier Kennedy (1852 in London – 1898 in St Ives) was a British artist. He studied at the Slade School and was renowned for his mythological paintings.

He was elected to the Royal Institute of Oil Painters in 1883 and became an Associate of the Royal Hibernian Academy in 1896.

His wife Lucy (née Marwood) was also an artist. Kennedy died in St Ives, Cornwall, in 1898, at the age of 46.

References

Additional sources
 Charles Napier Kennedy, Portrait and Figure Painter Library Ireland
 Portraits need restoration Londonderry Sentinel.

External links
 Charles Napier Kennedy at Artmagick.com

1852 births
1898 deaths
Alumni of the Slade School of Fine Art
British male painters
Painters from London
19th-century British painters
19th-century British male artists